Chrysopilus elegans is a snipe fly species in the genus Chrysopilus found from Costa Rica to Peru.

References

External links

Rhagionidae
Insects described in 1868
Taxa named by Ignaz Rudolph Schiner
Diptera of South America
Diptera of North America